Osvaldo Yero Montero (born October 23, 1969 in Camagüey, Cuba) creates sculpture and installations.

Individual exhibitions
He had many personal exhibitions, which include "La Hora de las Estrellas" presented in 1989, Alejo Carpentier Gallery, Camagüey, Cuba. In 1995 he exhibited his works in "De Corazón a Corazón. Una de Cada Clase"in Fundación Ludwig de Cuba, Centro de Conservación, Restauración y Museología (CENCREM), Havana, Cuba. In this year he also presented "Souvenirs, Algo para Recordar"
And in 1997 he made "Al rescate de la fauna", Teodoro Ramos Blanco, Havana, Cuba.

Collective exhibitions
He was part of many collective exhibitions. In 1989 he participated in the V Salón Provincial Fidelio Ponce de León, Centro Provincial de Artes Plásticas y Diseño, Camagüey, Cuba. In 1994 he was one of the selected artists for "La Jeune Peinture Cubaine", Maison de la Culture du Lametin, Fort de France. In this year some of his images were selected for "Arte Cubano de Hoy@ at the Galerie de L'UQAM, Université du Québec à Montréal. In 1998, he was one of the selected artists for "Contemporary Art from Cuba: Irony and Survival on the Utopian Island" Arizona State University Art Museum, Tempe.

References

 Vancouver Free Press, Fountain of Truth by Robin Laurence, May 26, 2005

External links
 Arizona State University Art Museum
 Universe in Universe website on the artist
 Morris and Helen Belkin Art Gallery website on the artist
 Center for Contemporary Canadian Art website on the artist
 Concordia University website article on the artist

Cuban contemporary artists
Living people
1969 births